Genoa is a town in Eastern Gippsland, Victoria, Australia. It is close to the New South Wales border where the Princes Highway crosses the Genoa River. The town is an important access point to the Croajingolong National Park. At the 2006 census, Genoa and the surrounding area had a population of 304.

The Genoa Post Office opened on 9 April 1888.

In 1972 the earliest fossil trackway of primitive tetrapods were found in the Genoa River Gorge, dating back 350 million years.

In 2019, bush fires in Eastern Gippsland did "significant" damage to Genoa and the nearby town of Mallacoota.

Genoa Peak
The walk to the summit is  one way, and is rated for a moderate/steep fitness level.

References

Towns in Victoria (Australia)
Shire of East Gippsland